The Broken Disk is a 1959 Turkish romantic drama film directed by Osman F. Seden. The stars of the film are Zeki Müren, Belgin Doruk, Ayfer Feray, Behzat Balkaya, Güney Dinç, Hayri Esen, and Muammer Gözalan.

References

External links
 
 

1959 films
Turkish romantic drama films
1959 romantic drama films